CDIA may refer to:
 Cities Development Initiative for Asia
 Consumer Data Industry Association